In enzymology, a glucosylceramidase is an enzyme that catalyzes the chemical reaction

D-glucosyl-N-acylsphingosine + H2O  D-glucose + N-acylsphingosine

Thus, the two substrates of this enzyme are D-glucosyl-N-acylsphingosine and H2O, whereas its two products are D-glucose and N-acylsphingosine.

This enzyme belongs to the family of hydrolases, specifically those glycosidases that hydrolyse O- and S-glycosyl compounds.  The systematic name of this enzyme class is D-glucosyl-N-acylsphingosine glucohydrolase. Other names in common use include:
 psychosine hydrolase,
 glucosphingosine glucosylhydrolase,
 GlcCer-beta-glucosidase,
 beta-D-glucocerebrosidase,
 glucosylcerebrosidase,
 beta-glucosylceramidase,
 ceramide glucosidase,
 glucocerebrosidase,
 glucosylsphingosine beta-glucosidase,
 and glucosylsphingosine beta-D-glucosidase.
This enzyme participates in sphingolipid metabolism and degradation of glycan structures.

Human proteins containing this domain
GBA belongs to Glycoside hydrolase family 30, GBA2 belongs to Glycoside hydrolase family 116.

References

Further reading
 
 

EC 3.2.1
Enzymes of known structure